Francisco Rojas Soto (born 16 October 1950) is a retired sprinter and hurdler from Paraguay.

Career
Rojas competed in the 400 m at the 1972 Olympics, but was eliminated in the first round. Rojas still holds the national record in the 400 m hurdles, which he set in Rio de Janeiro, Brasil. After retiring from competitions he worked at the Central Bank of Paraguay, and was eventually appointed as head of the Foreign Trade Division. Until 2013, for almost 20 years he was president of the Paraguayan Athletics Federation.

Education and Military
After receiving his degrees in finances and mechanical engineering, Rojas came to Asunción, where he completed the compulsory military service and graduated in economics in 1980. He started competing in running, initially barefoot, while studying in Asunción.

Personal life
Rojas is married to Celsa Isabel Prentte, they have four children.

References

1950 births
Living people
People from Ñeembucú Department
Paraguayan male sprinters
Paraguayan male hurdlers
Athletes (track and field) at the 1972 Summer Olympics
Olympic athletes of Paraguay
Athletes (track and field) at the 1975 Pan American Games
Pan American Games competitors for Paraguay